Nasir Abad is a village in Astore, Pakistan.  Nasir Abad has been traditionally used as a route for traders going to Kashmir from Astore, Gilgit and other parts of Pakistan. Nasir Abad is known for its delicacies like cumin and trout.

People of the village speaks Astori. Fishing is a common pursuit in the area. The Pakistan Army’s High Altitude School is located near Nasir Abad.

Populated places in Astore District